Kosik can refer to:

Kosik (elephant), an Indian elephant popular imitating Korean words
Košík, village and municipality of Czech Republic

People
Edwin Michael Kosik, American judge
Karel Kosík, Czech philosopher
Rafał Kosik, Polish writer

See also
Košíky, another Czech village and municipality
Kosika or kashaka, a percussion instrument from West Africa 
Kosikha, several localities in Russia